Minier is a village in Tazewell County, Illinois, United States. The population was 1,252 at the 2010 census. Minier is part of the Peoria, Illinois Metropolitan Statistical Area.

History
The village was named for its founder, G. W. Minier.

Geography
Minier is located at  (40.434336, -89.312797).

Demographics

As of the census of 2000, there were 1,244 people, 507 households, and 360 families residing in the village. The racial makeup of the village was 98.79% White, 0.16% African American, 0.16% Native American, 0.16% Asian, 0.32% from other races, and 0.40% from two or more races. Hispanic or Latino of any race were 1.29% of the population.

There were 507 households, out of which 32.0% had children under the age of 18 living with them, 58.0% were married couples living together, 10.7% had a female householder with no husband present, and 28.8% were non-families. 26.2% of all households were made up of individuals, and 12.8% had someone living alone who was 65 years of age or older. The average household size was 2.45 and the average family size was 2.95.

In the village, the population was spread out, with 25.9% under the age of 18, 5.9% from 18 to 24, 29.5% from 25 to 44, 21.6% from 45 to 64, and 17.0% who were 65 years of age or older. The median age was 38 years. For every 100 females, there were 91.4 males. For every 100 females age 18 and over, there were 87.0 males.

The median income for a household in the village was $41,900, and the median income for a family was $47,500. Males had a median income of $36,458 versus $26,667 for females. The per capita income for the village was $19,478. About 7.8% of families and 7.9% of the population were below the poverty line, including 11.8% of those under age 18 and 5.9% of those age 65 or over.

Notable residents
 Edward Buehrig, educator

References

External links
 Minier, Illinois

Villages in Tazewell County, Illinois
Villages in Illinois
Peoria metropolitan area, Illinois